The 1928 Birthday Honours were appointments by King George V to various orders and honours to reward and highlight good works by citizens of the British Empire. The appointments were made to celebrate the official birthday of The King, and were published in The London Gazette on 4 June 1928.

The recipients of honours are displayed here as they were styled before their new honour, and arranged by honour, with classes (Knight, Knight Grand Cross, etc.) and then divisions (Military, Civil, etc.) as appropriate.

United Kingdom and British Empire

Baron
Sir George Rowland Blades  by the name, style and title of Baron Ebbisham, of Cobham in the County of Surrey. President of the Federation of British Industries. Lord Mayor of London 1926-27. For public services.
The Rt. Hon. Sir Alfred Moritz Mond  by the name, style and title of Baron Melchett, of Landford in the County of Southampton. For public and political services.
Sir James Farquharson Remnant  by the name, style and title of  Baron Remnant, of Wenhaston in the County of Suffolk. Member of Parliament for Holborn since March 1900. For political and public services.

Privy Councillor
The King appointed the following to His Majesty's Most Honourable Privy Council:
Godfrey Lampson Tennyson Locker-Lampson  Member of Parliament for Salisbury January, 1910–18, and for Wood Green Division since December, 1918. Under Secretary of State for Foreign Affairs since December 1925, and for Home Affairs, 1923–24, and November 1924-December 1925

Baronetcies
The Rt. Hon. Edward Mervyn Archdale  Minister of Agriculture for Northern Ireland
William Walter Carlile  Member of Parliament for Buckingham Division 1895-1906. Chairman of the Magisterial Bench, Buckinghamshire, For political and public services in Buckinghamshire.
Major William Cope  Member of Parliament for Llandaff and Barry Division since December 1918. Comptroller of His Majesty's Household since January 1928. Lord Commissioner of His Majesty's Treasury March 1923 to January 1924, and November 1924 to January 1928
Sir Havilland Walter de Sausmarez, Bailiff of Guernsey
Robert Williams  Managing Director of Tanganyika Concessions

Knight Bachelor
John Sandeman Allen  Member of Parliament for West Derby Division of Liverpool since 1924. Member of the Council of the International Chamber of Commerce and Acting Chairman (Chairman Designate) of the Royal Colonial Institute. For political and public services.
Reginald Mitchell Banks  Member of Parliament for Swindon Division of Wiltshire since November 1922. Recorder of Wigan since April 1928. For political and public services.
Walter Baker Clode  President, Railway Raises Tribunal. Chairman, Rates Advisory Committee, Ministry of Transport
Cecil Allen Coward, President of the Law Society
Professor William Alexander Craigie  Joint Editor of the Oxford English Dictionary. Professor of English in the University of Chicago
Brigadier-General James Edward Edmonds  Director of the Military Branch, Historical Section, Committee of Imperial Defence
Sydney James Gammell. For political and public services in the North East of Scotland.
John Marice Æmilius Gatti  Ex-Chairman of the London County Council
Henry Cubitt Gooch  For political and public service's in the County of London. Member of Parliament for Peckham 1908-10 and member of the London County Council for 15 years, being Chairman 1923-24
Victor Raphael Harari Pasha  Director of the National Bank of Egypt and of the Agricultural Bank of Egypt. A leading member of the British community in Cairo. For services over a long period in promoting trade and commerce between England and Egypt
Enoch Hill  For political and public services in Yorkshire. Chairman of the Building Societies Association
James Atkinson Hosker  For political and public services in Bournemouth. Chairman of the Bournemouth Conservative Association
Archibald Hurd, Author of many works on Naval subjects
George Aitken Clark Hutchison  Member of Parliament for the Northern Division of Midlothian and Peebles, 1922–23 and since October 1924, and three times contested Argyllshire in the Unionist interest. For political and public services.
James Hopwood Jeans  Member of the Advisory Council for Scientific and Industrial Research. Secretary of the Royal Society
John Buck Lloyd, Junior, Financial Director of the Anglo-Persian Oil Company
Henry Thomas McAuliffe,  Member of the Corporation of the City of London; and Chairman of the Finance Committee for seven years
Percy Graham MacKinnon, Chairman of Lloyd's
Ernest Louis Meinertzhagen  Senior London County Council Member for Chelsea for over 20 years. Chairman of Chelsea Conservative Association. For public and political services.
Benjamin Howell Morgan, Chairman of British Empire Producers Organisation. For public services.
Francis Morris  Chairman of the Metropolitan Asylums Board
James Openshaw  For political and public services in Lancashire. President and Chairman of the Fylde Conservative Association
Max Pemberton  Author, Director of the London School of Journalism
Lieutenant-Colonel Charles Pinkham  Chairman of the Middlesex County Council
Nigel Playfair, Manager of the Lyric Theatre, Hammersmith
Reginald Ward Edward Lane Poole, For political and public services.
Spencer John Portal  Chairman of the Trustee Savings Banks Association, Chairman of the London Savings Bank
Lieutenant-Colonel Hugh Bateman Protheroe-Smith  Chief Constable, Cornwall. For services in the above-mentioned capacity and in connection with the relief of the Cornish tin miners and their families
George Stuart Robertson  Chief Registrar of Friendly Societies
Alderman Samuel Thomas Talbot  For political and public services in Birmingham
Thomas Marris Taylor  Vice Chairman of the Special Grants Committee, Ministry of Pensions
Gilbert Christopher Vyle, President, Association of British Chambers of Commerce, 1926–28
Henry Walker  His Majesty's Chief Inspector of Mines
Thomas Watts  Member of Parliament for Withington Division of Manchester November 1922-23 and since October 1924. For political and public services.
Colonel Albert Edward Whitaker  For political and public services in Nottinghamshire.
Thomas White  Chairman of the Central Valuation Committee for England and Wales

Dominions

Murray Bissett, Senior Judge of the High Court of Southern Rhodesia
The Hon. George Fowlds  President of Auckland University College, Dominion of New Zealand; for public services.
John Melrose, a prominent pastoralist in the State of South Australia; in recognition of his charitable services.
Lieutenant-Colonel Henry Simpson Newland  a leading surgeon of Adelaide, State of South Australia
Captain George Hubert Wilkins  distinguished Australian aviator and explorer

British India
Khan Bahadur Muhammad Usman Sahib Bahadur, Member of the Executive Council of the Governor of Madras
Babu Ganesh Datta Singh, Minister in charge of the Ministry of Local Self-Government, Bihar and Orissa
Maulavi Saiyid Muhammad Saadulla, Minister, Assam
Justice Alan Brice Broadway, Senior Puisne Judge, High Court of Judicature at Lahore
Justice Benjamin Lindsay, Puisne Judge, High Court of Judicature at Allahabad
Justice Henry Sheldon Pratt, Judge, High Court of Judicature at Rangoon
Jamshedji Behramji Kanga  Advocate-General, Bombay
Captain Edward James Headlam  Director of the Royal Indian Marine
Lieutenant-Colonel George Henry Willis  Royal Engineers, Master of the Security Printing Press at Nasik
Muhammad Akbar Nazar Ali Hydari, Nawab Hydar Nawaz Jang Bahadur, Sadr-ul-Maham, Finance Department, His Exalted Highness the Nizam's Government
Hadji Abdul Karim Abu Ahmed Khan Ghuznavi, Member of the Bengal Legislative Council
Austin Low  Chairman, Messrs. Griridlay & Co.

Colonies, Protectorates, etc.
Kitoyi Ajasa  Unofficial Member of the Legislative Council of Nigeria
Christian Ludolph Neethling Felling  General Manager, Kenya and Uganda Railways
Ewen Reginald Logan, Judge of the High Court, Northern Rhodesia
Thomas Laurence Roxburgh  Unofficial Member of the Privy Council of Jamaica
Gualterus Stewart Schneider, Senior Puisne Judge of the Supreme Court, Ceylon

The Most Ancient and Most Noble Order of the Thistle

Knight of the Most Ancient and Most Noble Order of the Thistle (KT)

Victor Alexander John, Marquess of Linlithgow

The Most Honourable Order of the Bath

Knight Grand Cross of the Order of the Bath (GCB)

Military Division
Royal Navy
Admiral of the Fleet Sir Henry Francis Oliver 

Army
General Sir John Philip Du Cane  Colonel Commandant, Royal Artillery, Aide-de-Camp General to The King, Governor and Commander-in-Chief, Malta and its Dependencies
General Sir George de Symons Barrow  Indian Army, Colonel 14/20th Hussars, Colonel, The Scinde Horse (14th Prince of Wales's Own Cavalry), Indian Army late General Officer. Commanding-in-Chief, Eastern Command, India

Civil Division
The Rt. Hon. Sir Esmé William Howard  His Majesty's Ambassador at Washington, D.C.

Knight Commander of the Order of the Bath (KCB)

Military Division
Royal Navy
Vice-Admiral Cyril Thomas Moulden Fuller 

Royal Air Force
Air Vice-Marshal Sir John Frederick Andrews Higgins

Civil Division
Sir Ernest Arthur Gowers  Chairman, Board of Inland Revenue
Maurice Linford Gwyer  Solicitor to the Treasury
Oswald Richard Arthur Simpkin  Public Trustee
Sir Charles John Howell Thomas  Permanent Secretary, Ministry of Agriculture and Fisheries

Companion of the Order of the Bath (CB)

Military Division
Royal Navy
Rear-Admiral John Moore Casement
Rear-Admiral the Hon. Matthew Robert Best 
Rear-Admiral Humphrey Thomas Walwyn 
Engineer Rear-Admiral Hugh Sydney Garwood 

Army
The Reverend Alfred Charles Eustace Jarvis  Chaplain General to the Forces (Chaplain to The King), Chaplain, Tower of London
Major-General Harold Ben Fawcus  Deputy Director General; Army Medical Services, War Office'
Colonel Reginald John Thornton Hildyard  Brigade Commander, 2nd Rhine Brigade, The British Army of the Rhine
Colonel Horace de Courcy Martelli  Commanding Royal Artillery, 42nd (East Lancashire) Division, Western Command
Colonel Evan Maclean Jack  Director General, Ordnance Survey, Ministry of Agriculture and Fisheries
Colonel Arthur Edward McNamara  Commandant, Small Arms School, Netheravon
Colonel Henry Barstow  Indian Army, Commander, Delhi Independent Brigade Area, India
Colonel William Albany Fetherstonhaugh  Indian Army, Commandant Lahore Base Sub-area, and Brigade Commander, Lahore Brigade Area, India
Colonel William Marshall Fordham  Indian Army, Deputy Adjutant and Quartermaster General, Eastern Command, India
Colonel Harold Boulton  Indian Medical Service, V.H.S., Assistant Director of Medical Services, Deccan District, India

Royal Air Force
Air Commodore Edgar Rainey Ludlow-Hewitt

Civil Division
Colonel Richard Vernon Tredinnick Ford 
Colonel John Edward Sarson  late 1st Volunteer Battalion, the Leicestershire Regiment, Honorary Colonel 4th Battalion, The Leicestershire Regiment
James Sidney Barnes  Assistant Secretary, Admiralty
Charles Patrick Duff  Private Secretary to the Prime Minister
Colonel Herbert Tom Goodland  Deputy Controller, Imperial War Grave's Commission, France and Flanders
Edgar Hackforth, Deputy Controller, Ministry of Health
James Stirling Ross  Director of Accounts, Air Ministry

Order of Merit (OM)

Sir George Abraham Grierson  In recognition of his eminent position as an Oriental Scholar and of the value to the Empire of his work on Indian Languages and Dialects

The Most Exalted Order of the Star of India

Knight Grand Commander (GCSI)
Sir Spencer Harcourt Butler  ex-Governor of Burma

Knight Commander (KCSI)
Sir William John Keith  Indian Civil Service, late Finance Member of the Executive Council of the Governor of Burma

Companion (CSI)
Leonard William Reynolds  Indian Civil Service, Agent to the Governor-General, Rajputana, and Chief Commissioner, Ajmer-Merwara
Hopetoun Gabriel Stokes  Indian Civil Service, Member, Board of Revenue, Madras
Rana Bhagat Chand, Raja of Jubbal, Simla Hill States
James Campbell Ker  Indian Civil Service, Private Secretary to His Excellency the Governor of Bombay
Maurice George Simpson, Director-in-Chief, Indo-European Telegraph Department

The Most Distinguished Order of Saint Michael and Saint George

Knight Grand Cross of the Order of St Michael and St George (GCMG)

Sir Charles Thomas Davis  Permanent Under-Secretary of State for Dominion Affairs
Sir Reginald Edward Stubbs  Captain-General and Governor-in-Chief of Jamaica

Knight Commander of the Order of St Michael and St George (KCMG)

Brigadier-General Sir Joseph Aloysius Byrne  Governor and Commander-in-Chief of Sierra Leone
The Rt. Hon. Isaac Alfred Isaacs, Senior Puisne Justice of the High Court of Australia
The Right Reverend Henry Hutchinson Montgomery  Prelate of the Most Distinguished Order of Saint Michael and Saint George
Lieutenant-Colonel Sir William Thomas Prout  Senior Medical Adviser to the Colonial Office
Ernest Amelius Rennie  His Majesty's Envoy Extraordinary and Minister Plenipotentiary to the Republic of Finland

Companion of the Order of St Michael and St George (CMG)
D'Arcy Wentworth Addison  Under-Secretary for the State of Tasmania, Chief Electoral Officer and Clerk to the Executive Council
Robert John Boyne, Government Representative on the Canned Fruit Export Control Board, Commonwealth of Australia
Robert William Dalton, His Majesty's Senior Trade Commissioner in the Commonwealth of Australia
The Very Reverend Alfred Robertson Fitchett  Dean of Dunedin, Dominion of New Zealand
Henry James Manson, New Zealand Trade Commissioner in the Commonwealth of Australia
Cyril Wilson Alexander, Acting Lieutenant Governor of the Northern Provinces, Protectorate of Nigeria
Hubert Russell Cowell, Assistant Secretary, Colonial Office
Herbert Henniker-Heaton, Colonial Secretary, Bermuda
John Lisseter Humphreys  Governor of the State of North Borneo
Reginald Fleming Johnston  Commissioner of Wei-hai-Wei
Lieutenant-Colonel Leonard Fielding Nalder  Anglor, Iraq. Delegate on the Turco-Iraq Frontier Delimitation Commission
John Hope Reford  lately Director of Medical and Sanitary Services, Uganda Protectorate
Major Arthur Henry Chamberlain Walker-Leigh, Chief Commissioner, Northern Territories of the Gold Coast
Henry James Brett, Acting Commercial Counsellor, Shanghai. Lancelot Giles, His Majesty's Consul at Swatow
Ernest Hamilton Holmes, His Majesty's Consul-General at Yokohama
Richard Edwardes More  Sudan Agent at Cairo
Arthur Langford Sholto Rowley, His Majesty's Consul-General at Antwerp
Brevet Lieutenant-Colonel Rupert Sumner Ryan  Deputy British High Commissioner on the Inter-Allied Rhineland High Commission

The Most Eminent Order of the Indian Empire

Knight Grand Commander (GCIE)
Sir William Malcolm Hailey  Governor of the Punjab

Knight Commander (KCIE)
Lieutenant Nawab Muhammad Ahmad Sa'id Khan  of Chhatari, Home Member of the Executive Council of the Governor of the United Provinces
Reginald Isidore Robert Glancy  Indian Civil Service, Agent to the Governor-General in Central India
Maharaja Bahadur Kshaunish Chandra Ray, of Nadia, Vice-President of the Executive Council of the Governor of Bengal (posthumous)

Companion (CIE)
Darbar Shri Vala Mulu Surag, Jurisdictional Talukdar of Jetpur-Pithadiah, States of Western India
George Goodair Dey, Chief Engineer and Secretary to the Government of Bengal in the Public Works Department
John Godfrey Beazley, Indian Civil Service, Secretary to the Government of the Punjab in the Transferred Departments
Algernon Earle Gilliat, Indian Civil Service, Secretary to the Government of Burma in the Finance Department
Richard Henry Beckett, Director of Public Instruction and Secretary to the Government of the Central Provinces in the Education Department
Theodore Benfey Copeland, Indian Civil Service
Francis Graham Arnould, Chief Engineer, Bombay, Baroda and Central India Railway
Charlton Scott Cholmeley Harrison, Chief Engineer, Lloyd Barrage and Canals Construction, Karachi, Bombay
Arthur Henderson Mackenzie, Director of Public Instruction, United Provinces
George Arthur Cocks  Inspector-General of Police, Punjab
Colonel Clarence Preston Gunter  Director, Frontier Circle, Survey of India
Professor Reginald Coupland, lately Member of the Royal Commission on the Superior Civil Services in India
William Stenning Hopkyns  Indian Civil Service
Lieutenant-Colonel Ernest William Charles Bradfield  Indian Medical Service, Professor of Surgery, Medical College, and Superintendent, General Hospital, Madras
Lieutenant-Colonel Lewis Cook, Indian Medical Service, Civil Surgeon, Bhagalpur, Bihar and Orissa
Lieutenant-Colonel George Denne Franklin  Indian Medical Service, late Chief Medical Officer, Delhi
Lieutenant-Colonel Robert Ross Will  Commandant, the Bengal Artillery Force
Lieutenant-Colonel John Cunningham, Indian Medical Service, Director, Pasteur Institute, Kasauli
Herbert Aubrey Francis Metcalfe  Secretary to the Chief Commissioner, North-West Frontier Province
Valangiman Krishnaswami Ayangar Aravamudha Ayangar, Indian Audit and Account Service, officiating Under Secretary to the Government of India, Commerce Department
Sydney David Smith, Deputy Commissioner of Excise, Bombay
George Edward Campbell Wakefield  Police and Public Works Minister, Jammu and Kashmir State
Raj Bahadur Badridas Goenka, Member of the Bengal Legislative Council
Hugh Gordon Roberts  Welsh Mission at Shillong, Assam
John Augustus Voelcker  of the Royal Agricultural Society of England

Imperial Order of the Crown of India

Her Highness the Senior Maharani Shrimati Chinkooraja Scindia, of Gwalior

The Royal Victorian Order

Knight Grand Cross of the Royal Victorian Order (GCVO)
The Rt. Hon. William Heneage, Earl of Dartmouth 
Major-General The Hon. Sir Cecil Edward Bingham

Knight Commander of the Royal Victorian Order (KCVO)
Sir Hugh Percy Allen 
Sir Charles John Holmes
John Marnoch , Surgeon
Major Philip Hunloke

Commander of the Royal Victorian Order (CVO)
The Hon. Montague Charles Eliot 
Sir John Prosser, lawyer (d.1945)
Charles John Dalrymple-Hay 
Alfred Bakewell Howitt  (Dated 21 April 1928)

Member of the Royal Victorian Order, 4th class (MVO)
Major Alexander Kilgour Macpherson, 10/2nd Bombay Pioneers
Captain Herbert Pott

Member of the Royal Victorian Order, 5th class (MVO)
James Atkinson
William Henry Reed

The Most Excellent Order of the British Empire

Knight Grand Cross of the Order of the British Empire (GBE)

Military Division

Civil Division
Sir John Dewrance  For public and political services.
Brigadier-General Sir Henry Percy Maybury  Director General of Roads, Ministry of Transport
Sir John Hubert Oakley, Member of the Irish Grants Committee

Diplomatic Service and Overseas List
Sir William Grenfell Max-Muller  lately His Majesty's Envoy Extraordinary and Minister Plenipotentiary at Warsaw

Dame Commander of the Order of the British Empire (DBE)
Elizabeth Wordsworth  late Principal of Lady Margaret Hall, Oxford
Eadith Campbell Walker  For philanthropic and charitable services in the State of New South Wales

Knight Commander of the Order of the British Empire (KBE)

Military Division
Royal Navy
Vice-Admiral Aubrey Clare Hugh Smith  (retired)

Army
Major-General Walter Holland Ogilvie  Indian Medical Service, Director of Medical Services, Army Headquarters, India
Major-General Casimir Cartwright van Straubenzee  General Officer Commanding Straits Settlements, Malaya

Civil Division

Alderman George Bevan Bowen  For political and public services in Pembrokeshire
Colonel Robert Arthur Johnson  Deputy Master, Royal Mint
William Maitland-Heriot  For political and public services in Dumfriesshire
Sir Edward Nicholl  For political and public services.
Sir Hugh William Orange  Accountant General, Board of Education
Nathaniel Francis Banner Osborn  Director of Army Contracts, War Office
Major Percival Reuben Reynolds  Ex-President of the National Association of British and Irish Millers

Diplomatic Service and Overseas List
Josiah Crosby  His Majesty's Consul-General, at Batavia
Herbert Goffe  lately one of His Majesty's Consuls-General in China
Lieutenant-Colonel Lionel Berkeley Holt Haworth, Political Resident in the Persian Gulf

Dominions
Colonel Ernest Haviland Hiley  late Chairman of the Rhodesian Railway Commission
Lieutenant-Colonel the Hon. James Anderson Murdoch  Member of the Legislative Council, State of New South Wales. For public and charitable services.

Colonies, Protectorates, etc.
Harold Baxter Kittermaster  Governor and Commander-in-Chief of the Somaliland Protectorate
William Peel  Chief Secretary to Government, Federated Malay States
Lieutenant-Colonel George Stewart Symes  Chief Secretary to the Government of Palestine; Resident and Commander-in-Chief designate at Aden

Commander of the Order of the British Empire (CBE)

Military Division
Royal Navy
Captain the Hon. Arthur Charles Strutt 
Surgeon Captain James Herbert Fergusson
Paymaster Captain Harry George Wilson

Army
Lieutenant-Colonel and Brevet Colonel Granville Arthur Battcock  4th Battalion The Royal Berkshire Regiment (Princess Charlotte of Wales's) Territorial Army
Colonel Howard Ensor  late Royal Army Medical Corps, Deputy Director of Medical Services, North China Command
Colonel John Standish Surtees Prendergast, Viscount Gort  late Grenadier Guards, General Staff Officer, 1st Grade, 4th Division, Eastern Command
Lieutenant-Colonel Lancelot Noel Friedrick Irving King  Royal Engineers, Senior British Commissioner, Jubaland Boundary Commission
Colonel Alfred Sinclair Marriott, Indian Army, Director of Farms, Master-General of Supply Branch, Army Headquarters, India
Lieutenant-Colonel Chilton Lind Addison-Smith  3rd Battalion The Seaforth Highlanders (Ross-shire Buffs, The Duke of Albany's)
Colonel Harry Reginald Walter Marriott Smith  late Royal Artillery, Director of Artillery, War Office
Colonel John Lindsay Smith, Indian Army, Deputy Director of Supplies and Transport, Northern Command, India
Principal Matron Catherine Geddes Stronach  Queen Alexandra's Imperial Military Nursing Service
Colonel Douglas Vere Willoughby  Indian Army, Officer Commanding 4th/1st Punjab Regiment, Indian Army
Quartermaster and Lieutenant-Colonel Stephen Wright  lately employed as Inspector of Army Catering, Department of the Quartermaster-General to the Forces, War Office

Royal Air Force
Group Captain George Laing

Civil Division

Jameson Boyd Adams  Divisional Controller, North Eastern Division, Ministry of Labour
Frederick James Adye, Secretary, Pacific Cable Board
Charles Francis Ball  For political and public services in Letchworth
Edward Gordon Beam, Chief Inspector, Outdoor Insurance Staff, Ministry of Health
Sir George Menteth Boughey  Secretary, Royal Colonial Institute
William Allport Brockington  Director of Education, Leicestershire
William Henry Carter, Assistant Director of Naval Construction, Admiralty
James Walker Clark  President of the Halifax Chamber of Commerce
John Clark  Director of Education, Glasgow Education Authority
David Davis  Chairman of London Insurance Committee
Gwendolyne Denton. For political services.
Major Sholto William Douglas  Chief Constable of the Lothians and Peebles
Ernest Arthur Eborall, Deputy Chief Inspector of Taxes, Inland Revenue
John Rankine Finlayson  Director of Manchester Chamber of Commerce since 1912
Francis Russell Gosset, Deputy Sergeant at Arms, House of Commons
Major John Harry Hebb  Royal Army Medical Corps (Retired), Director of Medical Services, Ministry of Pensions
John Broughton Knight, Controller, Clearing Office (Enemy Debts), Board of Trade
Cecil Howard Lander  Director of Fuel Research, Department of Scientific and Industrial Research
Samuel Lithgow  Chairman of the St. Marylebone & Paddington Local Employment Committee
Robert Findlay Longmuir, For political and public services in Ayr and the West of Scotland
Thomas William Houldsworth McDougal  Chairman, of the Lothians War Pensions Committee
Robert Lee Matthews  Chief Constable of Leeds
Alexander Millar, Secretary of the Antrim County Council
Emily Alicia George
Herbert Morrell  For political and public services in Oxfordshire and Berkshire
John Quirey, Vice President for Finance, London, Midland & Scottish Railway
Councillor Gwilym Rowlands  For political and public services in Rhondda, Glamorgan
The Hon. Lockhart Matthew St. Clair  Commandant, Metropolitan Special Constabulary
William Marshall Simpson, Postmaster-Surveyor, Liverpool
William Arthur Sturdy, Auditor, India Audit Office
Nathan Thompson  Inspector General of Waterguard, Board of Customs & Excise
Henry Weatherill  Assistant Comptroller, National Debt Office
Duncan Randolph Wilson  Secretary of the Industrial Fatigue Research Board, Medical Research Council
Harry Egerton Wimperis  Director of Scientific Research, Air Ministry

British India
Charles Maclvor Grant Ogilvie, Indian Civil Service, late Deputy Commissioner, Lahore
Joseph Terence Owen Barnard  Deputy Commissioner, Burma, on special duty with the Triangle Expedition, Burma
Raja Saiyid Ahmad Ali Khan Alvi  of Salempur, United Provinces
Pestonji Sorabji Kotwal, Second Additional Judicial Commissioner, Central Provinces
Percy Albert Cory  Honorary Treasurer of the Lady Minto's Indian Nursing Association, Home Branch

Diplomatic Service and Overseas List
Arthur Douglas Deane Butcher, Director of the Hydraulic Section, Egyptian Irrigation Department
Charles Fortescue Garstin, His Majesty's Consul at Shanghai
Colonel William Fanshawe Loudon Gordon, late Commandant of the Shanghai Volunteer Corps
James Henderson, President of the British Chamber of Commerce in Italy
Penrhyn Grant Jones, His Majesty's Consul at Harbin
Major Cecil Stephen Northcote, Governor of the Nuba Mountains Province, Sudan
Major Mervyn James Wheatley  Governor of Bahr-el-Ghazal Province, Sudan

Dominions
Shirley Sales  Assistant Imperial Secretary, South African High Commission
Clifford Henderson Hay  Under-Secretary and Permanent Head of the Premier's Department, State of New South-Wales
Robert Noble Jones, Chief Judge of the Native Land Court and Under-Secretary for Native Affairs, Dominion of New Zealand
George Shaw Knowles  Assistant Secretary and Assistant Parliamentary Draftsman, Attorney-General's Department, Commonwealth of Australia
Mary McLean, lately Principal of Wellington Girls' College, Dominion of New Zealand
Henry John Sheehan, Assistant Secretary, Treasury, Commonwealth of Australia
Frank Stratum  Assistant Secretary, Prime Minister's Department, Commonwealth of Australia

Colonies, Protectorates, etc.
Edward William Baynes  Colonial Secretary, Leeward Islands
William Douglas Davis Bowden, Commissioner of the Central Province, Sierra Leone
Walter Andrew Bowring, Treasurer, Gibraltar
Harold Kennard Holmes, Crown Solicitor, Hong Kong. For services for the welfare of the troops in Hong Kong
Humphrey Trice Martin, Commissioner for Local Government, Lands and Settlement, Kenya
Joseph Antoine Maurice Martin. Elected Member of the Council of Government, Mauritius. For public services.
Mathew Alexander Murphy  Director of Public Works, Trinidad
Lieutenant-Colonel John Edward Strathearn  Warden of the Hospital of the Order of Saint John of Jerusalem in Palestine
Robert Walter Taylor  Treasurer, Tanganyika Territory
George John Frederick Tomlinson, lately Assistant Secretary for Native Affairs, Nigeria

Officer of the Order of the British Empire (OBE)

Military Division
Royal Navy
Paymaster Captain Bernard William Gillhespie Cook (retired)
Commander John Fenwick Hutchings 
Lieutenant Commander Denys Arthur Henderson
Engineer Commander Bertram Harvey
Surgeon Commander Bryan Pickering Pick
Commander Ernest William Swan 

Army
Lieutenant-Colonel Herbert Charles Agnew, Royal Engineers
Lieutenant-Colonel and Brevet Colonel Harold Wood Barker  late 6th Battalion The West Yorkshire Regiment (The Prince of Wales's Own), Territorial Army
Major Robert Boal  Royal Engineers (Indian Army), Commanding Royal Engineer; 2nd Class, Loralai, India
Major Edward Bertie Hartley Berwick  Bossall School Contingent, Officers Training Corps
Inspector of Works and Major John Barker Bradshaw  Staff for Royal Engineer Services
Quartermaster and Captain George Brown, 3rd Battalion City of London Regiment (The Royal Fusiliers); Territorial Army
Major Valentine Rodolphe Burkhardt  Royal Artillery
Captain Esmond Humphrey Miller Clifford  Royal Engineers, Second British Commissioner, Jubaland Boundary Commission
Major Leslie Charles Bertram Deed  Royal Engineers, Military Engineering Services, India
Quartermaster and Lieutenant-Colonel Arthur Edward Everingham  Retired pay, Recruiting Staff, Scottish Command
Quartermaster and Captain James Henry William Ford  The Nottinghamshire Yeomanry (Sherwood Rangers), Territorial Army
Captain Alec Frankland, 1st/4th Bombay Grenadiers, Indian Army, General Staff Officer, 3rd Grade, General Staff Branch, Army Headquarters, India
Major James Hebblethwaite Martin Frobisher  Royal Army Medical Corps
Lieutenant-Colonel John Maxwell Gillatt  Regular Army Besecve of Officers, The Royal Scots (The Royal Regiment), lately Commanding 4th Battalion Iraq Levies
Captain William Angel1 Goddard, The Dorsetshire Regiment, late Assistant Superintendent, Physical Training, Aldershot Command
Lieutenant-Colonel Huntly Fleetwood Gordon, Indian Army, Army Remount Department, India
Lieutenant-Colonel Ernest William Grant, Staff Paymaster, Royal Army Pay Corps
Lieutenant-Colonel Humphrey Francis Humphreys  143rd Field Ambulance, Royal Army Medical Corps, Territorial Army
Captain Arthur Gwynne Kay, Royal Tank-Corps, Assistant Instructor, Tank Driving and Maintenance School, Headquarters Central Schools, Wool
Major Chilton Gresham Lewis, Royal Engineers, Superintendent, Indian Survey Department, attached to the Turco-Iraq, Frontier-Delimitation Commission
Lieutenant-Colonel Ernest Achey Loftus, 6th Battalion, The Essex Regiment, Territorial Army
Captain Ronald Tracy Alexander McDonald, Staff Corps, Australian Military Forces
Captain William Douglas McGregor, 1st King George's Own Gurkha Bines, Indian Army, attached B Corps Signals
Matron Lilian Emily Mackay  Queen Alexandra's Imperial Military Nursing Service
Major Albert Edward Macrae  Royal Artillery, lately Attached Royal Gun and Carriage Factories, Woolwich Royal Arsenal
Lieutenant-Colonel Otho Hugh Chartres Molony, Supernumerary List, Indian Army
Commissary and Major Patrick Moore, Indian Army Ordnance Corps
Commissary and Major Thomas Henry Naughton  Military Engineering Services, Indian Army
Captain Frederick William Ollis, The Gloucestershire Regiment, Chief Instructor, Chemical Warfare School, Porton
Lieutenant-Colonel Ernest Parbury, Indian Army Ordnance Corps, Inspector of Ammunition, Kirkee, India
Captain Andrew Peffers, The Cameronians (Scottish Bines), Staff Captain 56th (1st London) Division, Territorial Army
Major George Scott Nelson-Scott, 5th/6th (Renfrewshire) Battalion The Argyll and Sutherland Highlanders (Princess Louise's), Territorial Army
Lieutenant Evelyn Philip Servallis Shirley, The Royal Irish Fusiliers (Princess Victoria's), late Captain, Somaliland Camel Corps, The King's African Rifles
Major Douglas Gordon Smith, Commanding 1st Battalion Trinidad Light Infantry Volunteers
Quartermaster and Captain Alfred Summersell, Extra Regimentally employed List, Chief Clerk, Headquarters, Eastern Command
Major James Parry Swettenham  Commanding Selangor Volunteer Corps, Federated Malay States
Captain Douglas Rhys Thomas  The Bedfordshire and Hertfordshire Regiment, Adjutant 1st Battalion
Lieutenant-Colonel Henry Tudsbery Tudsbery  Essex Group, Anti-Aircraft Searchlight Companies, Royal Engineers, Territorial Army
Major Gordon Wilson  Royal Army Medical Corps
Captain Bramwell Henry Withers, The Loyal Regiment (North Lancashire), attached Sudan Defence Force

Royal Air Force
Squadron Leader Alan FitzRoy Somerset-Leeke
Christine Cameron  Matron, Princess Mary's Royal Air Force Nursing Service
The Reverend Maurice Henry Edwards  Chaplain, Royal Air Force

Civil Division

Alfred John Adams. For political and public services in Hertfordshire.
Tom Wood Ainge. For political services.
Captain George Frederick Alexander, General Secretary, Irish Sailors and Soldiers Land Trust
Milgitha Lettice Alcock, Clerk to His Majesty's Private Secretary
William Gerald Allen, Principal, Home Office
Frederick Nathaniel Bath, Accountant, Ministry of Health
Cyril Bavin, General Secretary, Migration Department of the National Councils of the YMCA of Great Britain and Ireland
Leslie Cecil Blackmore Bowker  Chief Clerk to the Law Officers of the Crown
Clifford Henry Boyd, Principal, Board of Trade
John Carmichael, Chief Constable of Dundee
The Venerable Archdeacon Harry William Carpenter  Archdeacon of Sarum. For many years service on behalf of the troops quartered on Salisbury Plain.
Lieutenant-Colonel Clarence Horatio Chapell, Examiner, Technical Examination Branch, War Office
Johanna Margaret Clay  Principal Matron for Scotland, Ministry of Pensions
Leonora Cohen  Chairman of the Women's Sub-Committee of the Leeds Local Employment Committee
Cecil Wharton Collard  Commander, Metropolitan Special Constabulary
Emily Jane Connor  For public services in Ulster.
Minna Galbraith Cowan,  For political and public services in Edinburgh.
Herbert William Crapp, Principal Clerk, Board of Inland Revenue
Ernest Lionel Victor Crocker, Senior Principal Clerk, Ministry of Pensions
James Crowther, Principal, Halifax Technical College
Elizabeth Harley Cunningham. For public services in the Isle of Man.
Daniel Nicol Dunlop, Director, British Electrical & Allied Manufacturers Association
Sydney George Edridge. For many years Chairman of the National Association of Probation Officers
Robert Elrick, Deputy Accountant General, Board of Customs & Excise
Percy Alexander Francis  Poultry Commissioner, Ministry of Agriculture and Fisheries
William Joseph Gannon, His Majesty's Divisional Inspector of Schools, Board of Education
Evelyn Margaret Garner, Principal of Women's Staff, Board of Inland Revenue
Christopher Hodson, Chief Constable of Blackburn
Councillor Adam Horrocks Hollingworth  For political and public services in Middleton, Lancashire
Surgeon Commander Walter Kempson Hopkins  (retired), Medical Officer, Board of Customs and Excise
Stamford Hutton  Chairman of the Gloucestershire War Pensions Committee
Charles Joseph Jeffries, Principal, Colonial Office
Robert Pierce Jones, Deputy Controller, Wales Division, Ministry of Labour
Anthony Edward Killick  Superintending Valuer, Board of Inland Revenue
John Kirkland  Architect, Board of Control
Octavius Lance  Director of Expense Accounts, Admiralty
Tennyson John David Large, late Collector of Customs and Excise, Belfast
Alexander Leighton  Rector, Morgan Academy, Dundee
Commander Frederick George Loring  (Retired) Inspector of Wireless Telegraphy, Post Office
Constance Mary Marwood, Superintendent, Money Order Department, Post Office
John Masterton  His Majesty's Divisional Inspector of Mines, Mines Department
Joseph Meller, For many years Chairman of the House Committee, Queen's Hospital for Children, Hackney Road
Teresa Merz  For services in connection with the Newcastle Hostel for training boys for Oversea Settlement
Alice Eva Marion Milnes, Secretary of the League of Mercy
Henry Oliver Minty  Principal Examiner, Patent Office, Board of Trade
Lieutenant-Colonel Eric Murray, Secretary, British Empire League
Albert Robert Myers  Senior Architect, H.M. Office of Works
Ellis Owen, Official Receiver in Bankruptcy, Cardiff
Ivor Llewelyn Phillips, Secretary, Welsh Association of Insurance Committees
Walter Bawden Pindar, Clerk to the Rural District Council of Hunslet
Harry Pratt, For political services.
George Ritchie Rice, Financial Adviser and Local Auditor with the Shanghai Defence Force
Edward Salmon, Editor of the Journal of the Royal Colonial Institute
Milly Gertrude Harry Selby, Chairman of the Bromley Division Conservative Women's Association. For political and public services in Kent.
John Robert Sivess  Deputy Civil Engineer-in-Chief, Admiralty
Reginald Stagg, Headquarters Supervisor of Home Areas, Navy, Army and Air Force Institutes
Henry Claude Taylor, Assistant Director in the Exhibitions Division of the Department of Overseas Trade
Frederick John Taylor  Chairman, Neath Local Employment Committee
Harold Victor Taylor  Horticultural Commissioner, Ministry of Agriculture and Fisheries
Samuel Robert Todd, Chief Inspector, Trade Boards Division, Ministry of Labour
Major William Sansome Tucker  Director of Acoustics at the Air Defence Experimental Establishment, War Office
Captain Herbert Reginald Vyvyan, Chief Constable of Devon
Frederick Porfeei Wensley  Chief-Constable of the Metropolitan Criminal Investigation Department
Percy John Wheeldon, Principal, Department of Scientific and Industrial Research
Richard Trefor Williams  Chief Insurance Inspector, Welsh Board of Health
William Williams  His Majesty's Divisional Inspector of Schools, Board of Education
Robert Humphrey Wilson, Clerk to the Belfast Board of Guardians
Ronald McKinnon Wood  Principal Scientific Officer, Royal Aircraft Establishment, Farnborough
George Henry Wright  Secretary of the Birmingham Chamber of Commerce

British India
M. R. Ry. Madhavan Nambiar Arachil Candeth Avargal, Indian Educational Service, Deputy Director of Public Instruction, Madras
Major Frank Cook, Engineer, Nabha State
Robert Foulkes, Member of the Madras Legislative Council, President, District Board, Madura
Khan Bahadur Chaudhri Fazal Ali  Member of the Punjab Legislative Council, Chairman, District Board, Gujrat
Raj Bahadur Doctor Kishori Lai Chaudhri  Assistant Director of Public Health, United Provinces
Leon Williamson Amps  Executive Engineer in charge of the construction of the British Legation Buildings at Kabul
Khan Bahadur Chaudhri Rashicl-ud-Din Ashraf, Taluqdar of Karkha, Bara Banki District, United Provinces
Terence Purves Dewar, Assistant Superintendent in charge of the Naga Hills Expedition, Burma
Percy Mitchell Russell Leonard, Assistant Superintendent, on duty with the Triangle Expedition, Burma
Joseph McGregor Cheers  Officer Supervisor, General Staff Branch, Army Headquarters
George Campbell Devon, State Engineer, Kotah, Rajputana
Matilda McGann, Mysore
Mangaldas Vijbhukhandas Mehta, Medical Practitioner, Bombay

Diplomatic Service and Overseas List
Mary Ethel Winifred, Lady Barton. In recognition of valuable services for the welfare of the Shanghai Defence Force.
James Godfrey Lyon Brown  For services in connection with the Emergency Volunteer Corps at Hankow
Alphonse Busuttil. For valuable services to British interests in Tunis
George Rammell Footner, Director of the Omdunnan Civil Hospital
The Reverend Robert Frew, Chaplain at The Hague
Cyril Havercroft, Deputy-General Manager, Sudan Government Railways and Steamers
John Colville Hutchison, Acting British Vice-Consul at Hankow
Lieutenant-Colonel Malcolm Hunter Logan, Shanghai Defence Force
Archibald Colin Christian Deleto MacDonald, Director of the Equipment and Finance Department of the Egyptian Ministry of Interior
Norman Lush Sparke In recognition of services in connection with the Shanghai Defence Force
George Ronald Storrar  Chief Engineer, Sudan Government Railways

Dominions
William Herbert Ifould, Principal Librarian and Secretary, Public Library, State of New South Wales
Henry Charles Weatherilt, Member of the European Advisory Council in the Bechuanaland Protectorate
Effie Io Wilkinson. For public services in the Commonwealth of Australia.

Colonies, Protectorates, etc.
Percy William Duncombe Armbrister, lately Receiver General and Treasurer, Bahama Islands
William Frederick Becker, Unofficial Member of the Legislative Council of Nigeria
Professor Albert Victor Bernard  Medical Officer of Health, Malta
Harold Frank Birchal, Construction Engineer, Kenya and Uganda Railways
The Venerable George Robert Blackledge, Archdeacon of Uganda
Robert Sutherland Cooke, Inspector-General, Ministry of Auqaf and Honorary Director of Antiquities, Iraq
Sydney Cuthbert, Unofficial Member of the Executive Council, British Honduras
Thomas Robert Cutler, Collector of Customs, Trinidad
Herbert George Dempster, Resident Engineer, Uganda Extension, Kenya and Uganda Railways
Cecil Moore Dobbs, Provincial Commissioner, Kenya
Duncan Elliott, lately Senior Executive Engineer, Public Works Department, Nigeria
Captain Bertram Alexander Francis, Collector of Customs and Harbour Master, Mauritius
Edward Butler Home, Provincial Commissioner, Kenya
William Hamilton Lee-Warner, lately District Officer, Federated Malay States
Emma Pauline Manasseh. For charitable services in the Straits Settlements
Arthur Stephen Mavrogordato, Commandant Department of Police and Prisons, Palestine
The Reverend Canon Frank Darvall Newham, Director of Education, Cyprus
Clifford Henry Fitzherbert Plowman, British Consul at Harar, Abyssinia. For services to the Somaliland Protectorate.
Edward Reginald Sawer, Director of the Department of Agriculture, Palestine
Nanayakkarage Don Stephen Silva, Justice of the Peace; for public and charitable services, Island of Ceylon
Alice Sproule. For charitable services in the Straits Settlements.
King'sley Willans Stead, Director of Customs, Excise and Trade, Palestine
Robert Sutherland  For services for the welfare of the troops in Hong Kong
Frank Edward Talland, Unofficial Member of the Legislative Council of the Gold Coast
Tso Shin-wan. For public services, Hong Kong.
Bertram Tom Watts, Director of Land Registration and Surveys, Cyprus
Major William Clement Francis Allan Wilson, Administrative Inspector, Ministry of Interior, Iraq
John Woodman, lately President, Court of First Instance, Iraq

Honorary Officers
Tahsin Beg Qadri, Rais al Awul, Aide-de-Camp to H.M. the King of Iraq

Member of the Order of the British Empire (MBE)

Military Division
Royal Navy
Engineer Lieutenant Commander Alfred Dore Slatter
Lieutenant Commander Instructor in Cookery Frank Pharoah
Telegraphist Lieutenant Alonzo Boniface (retired)
Commissioned Master at Arms Robert Henry Johnson
Headmaster John Alfred Rowe
Chief Skipper Peter Yorston  Ordnance
Lieutenant-Commander George Prideaux 

Army
Deputy Commissary and Captain Arthur Ambrose, Superintendent, Adjutant General's Branch, Army Headquarters, India
Captain Robert James Appleby, 2nd Battalion, The Durham Light Infantry
Sergeant-Major Instructor Frank Barber, Royal Artillery, School of Artillery, Larkhill
Mechanist Quartermaster-Sergeant Clifford Barton, Royal Army Service Corps, attached Sudan Defence Force
First Class Staff Sergeant-Major John Thomas Bevvs, Royal Army Service Corps, Department of the Quartermaster-General to the Forces, War Office
Lieutenant Ashley Raymond Bond, 2nd Battalion, The Durham Light Infantry
Conductor George Joseph Flowerdew Brown, Indian Unattached List, Military Engineering Services, Indian Army
Regimental Sergeant-Major Henry Nichol Close, The Royal Scots Greys (2nd Dragoons)
Captain Vivian Dykes, Royal Engineers, Staff Captain Department of the Quartermaster-General to the Forces, War Office
Quartermaster and Captain Charles Edward Easterbrook, Royal Engineers
Battery Sergeant-Major Ernest Francis Ferraro, Hampshire Heavy Brigade, Royal Artillery, Territorial Army
Regimental Quartermaster Sergeant Henry Howard Fletcher, Supernumerary List, Coldstream Guards, attached Royal Military College, Sandhurst
Superintending Clerk Herbert Benjamin James Franklin, Royal Engineers, Department of the Chief of the Imperial General Staff, War Office
First Class Assistant Surgeon Edward Henry Gillson, Indian Medical Department
Lieutenant Alfred Percy Green, Royal Artillery
Staff Sergeant-Major Christopher Henry Hanson, Royal Army Service Corps, Department of the Adjutant General to the Forces, War Office
Risaldar Hari Singh, Indian Army Service Corps, Cavalry Brigade, Transport Company
Deputy Commissary and Captain William Harrison, Indian Miscellaneous List, Superintendent, General Staff Branch, Army Headquarters, India
Captain George Waddell Harvey, Forth Heavy Brigade, Royal Artillery, Territorial Army
Quartermaster and Captain Thomas Webster Hill, 5th Battalion The Loyal Regiment (North Lancashire), Territorial Army
Lieutenant Reginald Thomas Hockey  96th (Royal Devon Yeomanry) Field Brigade, Royal Artillery, Territorial Army
Lieutenant Gilbert Daly Holmes, Royal Artillery, attached Somaliland Camel Corps, The King's African Rifles, lately attached 3rd (Kenya) Battalion The King's African Rifles and Officer Commanding Escort, Jubaland Boundary Commission
Captain Frederick Ralph Honeyball, 4th/10th Baluch Regiment, Indian Army
Lieutenant Henry Richard Hopking, The Suffolk Regiment, Adjutant 2nd Battalion
Lieutenant Harry Alfred Adrian Howell, The Middlesex Regiment (Duke of Cambridge's Own), Local Captain, Assistant Staff Officer to the Local Forces, Straits Settlements, Malaya
Ordnance Executive Officer 2nd Class and Captain George Ernest Victor Howe's, Royal Army Ordnance Corps
Company Sergeant-Major Albert Murray Humphreys  26th (London) Anti-Aircraft Battalion (London Electrical Engineers) Royal Engineers, Territorial Army
Acting Sergeant-Major Leslie Herbert Ives, Royal Army Medical Corps, attached 48th (South Midland) Divisional Medical Services
Sergeant-Major Frederick John Lionel Jeffery, Indian Unattached List, Embarkation Sergeant-Major, Burma
Lieutenant Alfred Douglas Murray Lewis, The Royal Welsh Fusiliers, temporary Captain Somaliland Camel Corps, The King's African Rifles
Instructor John Patrick Loughlin, Army Educational Corps
Quartermaster Sergeant-Instructor John George Maughan, Royal Tank Corps
Regimental Sergeant-Major Thomas William Milner, 1st Battalion The Duke of Wellington's Regiment (West Riding)
Company Sergeant-Major (Acting Regimental Sergeant-Major) George Mitchell  5th Battalion The Green Howards (Alexandra, Princess of Wales's Own Yorkshire Regiment), Territorial Army
Quartermaster and Captain Frank Moore, Royal Army Service Corps
Regimental Sergeant-Major William Murray  2nd Battalion Scots Guards
Lieutenant Harry Norman Newey, Army Educational Corps, late Instructor, Army School of Education, Belgaum, India
Regimental Sergeant-Major Victor Charles Northover, Devonshire (Fortress) Royal Engineers, Territorial Army
Company Sergeant-Major Thomas Coulthard O'Brien  Royal Engineers, Chemical Warfare School, Porton
Quartermaster Sergeant-Instructor Thomas William Pedley, Royal Engineers, Survey School, School of Military Engineering, Chatham
Subadar-Major Piran Ditta  late Hong Kong Singapore Brigade, Royal Artillery
Commissary and Major Harry Pluck, Indian Miscellaneous List, Officer Supervisor, Master-General of Supply Branch, Army Headquarters, India
Quartermaster and Lieutenant Frederick Preston, Corps of Military Police
Quartermaster and Captain John Robinson, 8th Battalion The Lancashire Fusiliers, Territorial Army
Assistant Commissary and Lieutenant Felix Deeble Rogers, Indian Miscellaneous List, Chief Clerk, Burma District
Battery Sergeant-Major Charles Lewis Ryan, 66th (South Midland) Field Brigade Royal Artillery, Territorial Army
Staff Quartermaster-Sergeant Aubrey Oswald Sibbald, Royal Army Service Corps
Garrison Sergeant-Major Henry Arthur Singleton, Garrison Staff, Aldershot
Regimental Sergeant Major William Stevenson  1st Battalion Welsh Guards
Regimental Sergeant-Major Alfred Sutherland, Depot, Royal Tank Corps
Surveyor of Works and Lieutenant Stanley James Templeton, Royal Engineers
Battery Sergeant-Major Daniel Vigar, 51st (Westmorland and Cumberland) Field Brigade, Royal Artillery, Territorial Army
Assistant Commissary and Lieutenant Alexander Vingoe, Indian Corps of Clerks
Company Sergeant-Major Alfred Frederick Warwick, 24th (Derbyshire Yeomany) Armoured Car Company, Royal Tank Corps, Territorial Army
Commissary and Major Albert Waters, Indian Army Service Corps
Battery Sergeant Major Charles William Edward Workman  Hampshire Heavy Brigade, Royal Artillery, Territorial Army
Sergeant-Major Instructor Arthur Worsley  retired pension, late Army Physical Training Staff, Aldershot

Royal Air Force
Flight Lieutenant Hugh Nelson
Sergeant Major 1st Class Reginald Arthur Howes
Sergeant Major 2nd Class Herbert William Smith

Honorary Member
Rab Khaila David D'Mar Shimun, Aide-de-Camp to the Commandant, Iraq Levies

Civil Division
Charles Herbert Benson Abbot, Accountant Cashier, France, Imperial War Graves Commission
John Frederick Anstead, Staff Clerk, War Office
Benjamin George Arthur, Secretary of the National Leather Goods and Saddlery Manufacturers Association
Gladys Bertha Attwood, Chief Superintendent of Typists, Mines Department
Charles McKenzie Bell, Chief Superintendent, Durham Constabulary
William Robert Bell  Clerk of the Newry Board of Guardians and of the Newry Rural District Councils
Paymaster Commander Thomas Robert Best  Chief Superintendent, N.E. Coast District Mercantile Marine Office, Board of Trade
Walter Robert Black  Assistant Principal, Ministry of Agriculture and Fisheries
Ursula Henrietta Blackwood, Superintendent of Translators, War Office
George Herbert Bowler, Chief Area Officer, Ministry of Pensions
Agnes Bowley, Late Head Mistress of Medway Street Infants Department, Leicester
John David Brown, Traffic Accountant, Pacific Cable Board
William Alfred Bunner, Inspector of Stamping, Somerset House
James Lawther Clark, Clerk of the Antrim Board of Guardians and Rural District Council
Letitia Sarah Clark  Matron, Whippa Cross Hospital
Arthur Markland Clegg, Staff Officer, Mines Department
James Craig, Superintendent and Deputy Chief Constable, Westlothian
Francis Hoyland Crapper, Superintendent, Lancashire Constabulary. For devoted and meritorious police service particularly in connection with the floods at Fleetwood in October, 1927
William Irwin Cunningham, Town Clerk of Portrush Urban District Council
Cornelius Curran, Senior Staff Officer, Statistical Office, Board of Customs and Excise
James Wright Dick, Acting First Class Clerk, Ministry of Health
Edwin Page, Examiner of Dockyard Work, Engineer-in-Chief s Department, Admiralty
James Donald Feely. Higher Executive Officer, Ministry of Pensions
Walter Cecil Fenwick, Contract Officer, Air Ministry
Robert Chesney Finney, First Class Examiner in the Companies (Winding-up) Department, Board of Trade
Thomas Ogle Freeman (senior), Collector of Taxes, Newcastle upon Tyne
Leonard David Gibbs, Clerk, Records Department, London, Imperial War Graves Commission
Walter Gordon, Superintendent, Wigan Borough Police
Rosa Forsyth Grant, Masseuse, Military Hospital, Edinburgh. For voluntary services.
Albert Griffiths, Clerk to the Bridgend and Cowbridge Board of Guardians
Robert William Hanna, Secretary of the British National Committee of the International Chamber of Commerce
Robert Harper, Chairman of the Medway Boroughs, Gravesend and District War Pensions Committee
Amy Louise Hatch, Higher Clerical Officer (Divisional Superintendent), Ministry of Pensions
William Henderson, Accountant, Board of Customs and Excise
Eliza Mary George Henry. Retired teacher. For services to education in Banffshire and the Western Isles
Edith Harriet Herbert, Superintendent of Royal College of St. Katharine, Poplar
Dorothy Aileen Humphrey, Assistant Secretary to the Permanent Under Secretary of State, Foreign Office
George Thomas Hyden  Chairman of the Consett, Blaydon and District War Pensions Committee
Jean Kennedy Irvine, Superintendent, South-Eastern Pricing Bureau. For meritorious service in connection with the National Health Insurance Scheme
Charlotte Keeling  Member of the Westminster, Kensington and Chelsea War Pensions Committee
Alfred William Kingsland, Treasurer and Accountant to the Borough of Ramsgate
George Thomas Knight, Superintendent and Deputy Chief Constable, Hertfordshire Constabulary
Richard Knox, Superintendent, Hampshire Constabulary
Robert Cecil Last, Staff Officer, Board of Inland Revenue
Janet Coghill Swanson Luke. For political and public services in Lanarkshire.
The Reverend Joseph McKenna. For services during the floods at Fleetwood in October 1927
Alexander Mackenzie, Superintendent and Deputy Chief Constable, Argyllshire
Albert McLean, Organising Master, Carlton Street Senior Evening Institute, Bradford
Councillor Patrick McNicholas. For services during the floods at Fleetwood in October 1927
Ernest William Moat, Superintendent, Middlesex Deeds and Land Charges Department, Land Registry
John William Monson, Staff Officer, Board of Inland Revenue
Katharine Moore, Confidential Shorthand Typist to the Secretary of State, and Assistant to the Private Secretary, India Office
John Reginald Nelson, Staff Clerk, War Office
William Hastings Nichols, Superintending Clerk, Accountant General's Department, Admiralty
William Ernest Noall, Staff Officer, Dominions Office
Rosina Palmer  Member of the Worcester, Kidderminster and District War Pensions Committee
William George Paramour, Superintendent, Kent Constabulary
George Henry Paxon, Accountant, Finance Department, Ministry of Labour
Kate Annie Popert, Accountant, Finance Department, Ministry of Labour
Grace Alice Rees, Manager, Special Employment Exchange for Women, Girls and Boys, Great Marlborough Street
Alfred James Richards, Chief Superintendent, Staffordshire Constabulary
William Rowbotham, Superintending Clerk, Pensions Department, Ministry of Health
George Ernest Russell, Head Master, Battle Council Mixed Department, Reading
Wilfred George Sanders, Constructor, Department of the Director of Naval Construction, Admiralty
John Thomas Savill, formerly Head Master of Bladon School, Oxfordshire
Olive Letitia Scurlock, Chief Superintendent of Typists, Board of Trade
Arthur Henry Shepherd, Head of Section, Superintendent of Lines Department, Great Western Railway
Charles Henry Simonds, Clerk to the Recorder of Bradford
Ernest Smith, Higher Clerical Officer, Ministry of Health
Lieutenant-Colonel Frederick William Smith  Superintendent, Glamorgan Constabulary
Henry Watson Stockman, First-Class Clerk, Ministry of Health
Frederick Carey Stringer, Senior Staff Clerk, War Office
Robert William Strugnell, Assistant Civil Engineer, Works and Buildings Department, Air Ministry
John Taft, Governor of H.M. Borstal Institution, Feltham, Middlesex
Alfred Edmund Taylor, Superintendent, Shropshire Constabulary
Harry Robert Tooley, Acting Expense Accounts Officer, Admiralty
Wallace John Turl, Higher Clerical Officer, Ministry of Health
Stanley William Vaughan, Details Superintendent Clerk, Motor Transport, France and Belgium, Imperial War Graves Commission
Arthur Edward Walker, Senior Executive Officer, Secretaries Office, Board of Customs and Excise
Edmund Seller Wiggins, Higher Clerical Officer, Ministry of Health
Mabel Agnes Wilde, Honorary Secretary of the Tunbridge Wells Committee of the Kent Association for Empire Settlement
Barbara Edith Barber Williams. For charitable services in Southport
Samuel John Young, Manager, Shoreditch Employment Exchange, Ministry of Labour

British India
Francis Woodman-Wilson  Executive Electrical Engineer, and Electrical Inspector to Government, Bombay
William Henry King, Assistant Engineer, Posts and Telegraphs Service
Edwin Harold Brandon, Assistant Secretary, Home Department of the Government of India
William Norman Richardson  Bombay Civil Service, Deputy Collector and City Magistrate, Karachi
Arthur Matthews, Officer Supervisor, Adjutant-General's Branch, Army Headquarters
Rao Bahadur Waman Ganesh Rale, retired Deputy Collector, Bombay
Mark William Smith, Superintendent, Foreign and Political Department, Government of India
James Henry Green, Superintendent, Department of Education, Health and Lands, Government of India
Herbert Cyrill Marshall Upshon, Jailor, Presidency Jail, Calcutta
Captain Frank Ernest Hitchin, Superintendent, Borstal School, Tanjore, Madras
Henry Kelegher Penrose, Secretary, Municipal Committee and District Board, Peshawar
Herbert Matthew Cameron Harris, Head Master, Government High School, Ajmer, Rajputana
William Baker Cairns, Quarry and Stoneyard Officer, Delhi
Alfred William Conolly, Works Manager (Production), Rifle Factory, Ishapore
Ruth Young, Personal Assistant to the Chief Medical Officer, Women's Medical Service, and the Secretary of the Funds under the Presidency of Her Excellency the Lady Irwin
Pandit Ram Nath, Principal, Pandit Baij Nath High School, Amritsar
Khan Sahib Ardeshir Ruttonji Mehta, Senior Hospital Storekeeper, British Military Hospital, Quetta

Diplomatic Service and Overseas List
Harry James Archibald, Editor and Proprietor of the Central China Post
Joseph William Caruana, British Pro-Consul at Port Said
Robert Diacono, President of the Maltese Community in Cairo
James Lawrie Duncan, Master of Works, Khartoum Province
Ernest Edwin Gabbetis, Superintendent of Works, Public Works Department, Sudan Government
Martha Isabel Garvice, Senior Lady Medical Officer, Egyptian Ministry of Education
The Reverend Bertie James Harper, Khartoum
Meta Hunt, Social and Educational Worker, Khartoum
Thomas Cornelius Sargent, British Vice-Consul at Santiago
Frank Wicker, Secretary of the Hertford British Hospital in Paris

Dominions
Louisa Adlam, lately Matron-in-Chief of the Southern Rhodesia Nursing Service

Colonies, Protectorates, etc.
Captain Frederick Stanworth Adey. For services for the welfare of the troops in Hong Kong.
Mabel Winifred Mary Alabaster. For services for the welfare of the troops in Hong Kong.
Edward Bird, Chief Clerk in the Governor's Office, Kenya
Leila Evelyn de Lisle Bowen, Honorary Secretary of the Naval Welfare League, Barbados. For services in providing entertainment and hospitality for men of H.M. Ships.
James Frederick Corson  Assistant Bacteriologist, Medical and Sanitary Department, Tanganyika Territory
Francis Lionel Daniel, Justice of the Peace and Unofficial Police Magistrate, Colombo, Ceylon
John Adolphus Songo Davies, Unofficial Member of the Legislative Council, Sierra Leone
Muriel Hanschell, President of the Naval Welfare League, Barbados. For services in providing entertainment and hospitality for men of H.M. Ships.
Commander Fred Mason Jenkins, Marine Superintendent, Kenya and Uganda Railways
George Maclean  Sleeping Sickness Officer, Medical and Sanitary Department, Tanganyika Territory
Nevile Southcote Mansergh, Commissioner of Police, Gold Coast
Muriel Edith Miskin, Principal of the Deaf and Blind School at Mount Lavinia, near Colombo, Ceylon
Augustus Rawle Parkinson, Headmaster of the Wesley Hall Elementary School, Barbados
Alice Christabel Remington. For services for the welfare of the troops in Hong Kong.
John Goodwin Roberts, Public School Teacher in the Out-islands, Bahama Islands
Lois Mary Roberts, Matron of the Public Hospital, Belize, British Honduras
Beatrice Russell-Brown. For services for the welfare of the troops in Hong Kong.
Raymond Gustave Sargeant, Port Captain, Kenya
Charles Henry Joseph Sheppard, Inspecting Officer of Police, Iraq
James Godfrey Tetteh O'Baka Torto, Treasury Assistant, Nigeria
Emily Mary Tull. For services in connection with the Baby Welfare Movement in Grenada, Windward Islands
Agnes Catherine Wolfe. For services for the welfare of the troops in Hong Kong.

Honorary Members
Nejib Effendi Bawarshi, Assistant District Officer, Palestine
Abdel Baszak Effendi Kleibo, Assistant District Officer, Palestine
Yeshua Shami  Medical Officer, Department of Health, Palestine

Members of the Order of the Companions of Honour (CH)

Professor John Scott Haldane  Director of the Mining Research Laboratory of Birmingham University. For Scientific work in connection with industrial disease.

Kaisar-i-Hind Medal

First Class
Winifred May, Lady Wilson, Bombay
Rai Bahadur Sir Bipin Krishna Bose  Vice-Chancellor, Nagpur University, Central Provinces
Iris Goodeve Brayne, Gurgaon, Punjab
Christian Frederik Frimodt-Møller, Medical Superintendent, Union Mission Tuberculosis Sanatorium, Madanapaller Chittoor District, Madras
Ada Lee, Superintendent, Lee Memorial Mission, Calcutta
Father Alphonse Fargeton, Superintendent, Rangoon Leper Asylum, Burma
Annie Caroline Smith, in charge of the Zenana Hospital of the Church of Scotland Mission, Gujrat
Robert Johnston Ashton  Kachwa, Mirzapur District, United Provinces

British Empire Medal (BEM)

Military Division

For Meritorious Service
Corporal Kashi Mohanied, 3rd Battalion, The King's African Rifles

Civil Division

For Meritorious Service
John Berry, Superintendent of Messengers, and Office Keeper
John Britch, Constable, Lancashire Constabulary
Thomas Jones, Fireman, Lytham St. Annes Fire Brigade
Charles Adolphus Judd, Superintendent of Messengers in the office of the Parliamentary Secretary to the Treasury
Henry Kirkham, Fireman, Lytham St. Annes Fire Brigade
George Lament, Inspector, Lanarkshire Constabulary
Francis Graham Marshall, Sub-District Commandant, Royal Ulster (Special) Constabulary
Epbert Moore, Sergeant, Royal Ulster Constabulary
William Burnett Smithwick, Market Constable, Liverpool
Thomas Sumner, Constable, Lancashire Constabulary

Military Cross (MC)

Captain Christopher Ronald Spear, 13th Frontier Force Rifles, 5th Battalion (late 58th Vaughan's Rifles, Frontier Force), Indian Army, in recognition of gallant and distinguished services in action during military operations in China in March 1927.

Air Force Cross (AFC)

Flight Lieutenant Thomas Stanley Horry 
Flight Lieutenant Robert Lyle McKendrick Barbour 
Flight Lieutenant David D'Arcy Alexander Greig

Air Force Medal (AFM)
Flight Sergeant (Pilot) Harry Walter Woods
Leading Aircraftman Francis Thomas Arney

Imperial Service Order (ISO)
Home Civil Service
Frank Ernest Allum, Deputy Master of the Branch Mint at Perth, Western Australia
Arliss Hayden Carter, Accountant, Ministry of Health
David Crombie, Secretary and Inspector, Prison Commission for Scotland
Henry Charles Glaysher  Senior Staff Clerk, War Office
David Allan Gracey  Superintending Chemist, Government Chemist's Department
Albert Thomas John Lister Guest, Clerk in charge of Registration and Muniments, Charity Commission
Arthur Hogan  Senior Auditor, Exchequer and Audit Department
Albert Edward Laslett, Engineer Surveyor-in-Chief and Inspector of Testing Establishments, Board of Trade
Donald Macleod, Sub-Inspector, Scottish Education Department
Edward John Metters, Chief Clerk, Children's Branch, Home Office
Edward Parkes  Technical Assistant in Consular Department, Foreign Office
George Slater, Controller, Money Order Department, General Post Office
Walter George Twort, Chief Inspector, National Insurance Audit Department
William Vickers, Senior Staff Officer, Exchequer, Edinburgh

Dominions
Harry Blinman  Under-Secretary, Secretary to the Premier and Clerk of the Executive Council, State of South Australia 
Captain John Bollons, Master of S.S. Tutanekai, Marine Department, Dominion of New Zealand
Joshua Dyson Farrar, Chief Electoral Officer, Department of Home and Territories, Commonwealth of Australia
Henry Latimer Walters, Secretary, Department of Works and Railways, Commonwealth of Australia
Basil Hale Warner, lately an Assistant Commissioner in Swaziland

Indian Civil Service
Khan Bahadur Hafiz Muhammad Wilayatullah, Deputy Commissioner, Bhandara, Central Provinces
Khan Bahadur Ahmed Bakhsh, Assistant Residency Surgeon, Personal Assistant to the Administrative Medical Officer in Central India and Superintendent, Central India Agency Jail, Indore
Ardeshir Edalji Servai  Acting Under Secretary to the Government of Bombay in the Revenue Department
Jogindra Chander Ghose, Punjab Civil Service, Secretary, District Board, Ludhiana, Punjab

Colonial Civil Service
Cecil Molesworth Bunbury, Chief Engineer, Kenya and Uganda Railways
Henry Casolani  Superintendent of Emigration, Malta
Charles Herman Vidal Hall, lately Collector of Revenue, Jamaica
George William Knapman, Establishment Officer, Secretariat, Kenya
Philip Thomas Lamble, Superintendent of Staff and Works, Sanitary Department, Hong Kong
Hugh McLaren, Principal of the Accra Technical School, Gold Coast
Robert James Pereira, Extra Office Assistant to the Government Agent, Western Province, Ceylon
Amaro John Reed, Accountant, Post Office, Hong Kong
Ratu Deve Toganivalu, Member of the Legislative Council, and Provincial Commissioner, Fiji
Leslie Tucker, Federal Inspector of Schools, Leeward Islands

Imperial Service Medal (ISM)

Baroda Behari Banerji, late Senior Compositor, Press of the Private Secretary to His Excellency the Viceroy
Sargonath Coomar, late Record Sorter, Foreign and Political Department of the Government of India
Pandit Salig Rarn, Jamadar to the Chief Justice, High Court of Judicature at Allahabad
Muhammad Moideen, late Duffadar, Legislative Council Office, Madras
Saidai Khan of Yarkand, late Consulate Postman between Yarkand and Kashgar
Hardwar Tiwari, late Reserve Warder and Orderly to the Inspector-General of Prisons, United Provinces

References

Birthday Honours
1928 awards
1928 in Australia
1928 in India
1928 in New Zealand
1928 in the United Kingdom